Debbie Ferguson-McKenzie (born 16 January 1976) is a former Bahamian sprint athlete who specialised in the 100 and 200 metres. Ferguson-McKenzie participated in five Olympics.

Ferguson-McKenzie is assistant coach of track and field at University of Kentucky. Previously, she coached for four years at the University of Houston.

In 1995, she was awarded the Austin Sealy Trophy for the
most outstanding athlete of the 1995 CARIFTA Games. In total she won 7 gold, 9 silver, and 2 bronze CARIFTA Games medals.

She had her first major successes with the Bahamian 4×100 metres relay team, winning gold at the Pan American Games and World Championships in Athletics in 1999, and taking another gold at the Olympic Games the following year. She won her first individual gold medal at the 2001 World Championships – having initially won silver, gold medallist Marion Jones was later disqualified.

The 2002 season was a career high for Ferguson-McKenzie: she won five gold medals, with victories at the IAAF World Cup and Grand Prix Final, and a 100 m, 200 m and relay gold at the 2002 Commonwealth Games. Her performance in the 100 m remains a personal best, and her time in the 200 m was a commonwealth games record and fastest by any athlete that year. She won her only individual Olympic medal in 2004, taking bronze in the 200 m. Injury ruled her out for the whole of 2005. She failed to reach the finals at the 2007 World Championships, unable to compete with the new generation of American and Jamaican sprinters. However, she managed to reach the 100 and 200 metres finals at the 2008 Beijing Olympics.

She was the previous 200 m national record holder with a best of 22.19 seconds. Her record was broken by Shaunae Miller-Uibo (22.05 seconds) at the 2016 Jamaica Grand Prix. Her 100 m best (10.91) is the second fastest time by a Bahamian after Chandra Sturrup.

In 2014 Ferguson-McKenzie became the women's sprints and hurdles coach for the track and field program at the University of Houston.

Ferguson-McKenzie was coached some part of her professional career by Henry Rolle.

Career
Ferguson attended St Andrew's School in Nassau, Bahamas and graduated in 1994.

Ferguson graduated from University of Georgia from where she launched her senior athletics career since which she has gained medals at the Summer Olympics, IAAF World Championships in Athletics, Commonwealth Games and Pan American Games.

In 2002, she was appointed as an ambassador for the United Nations Food and Agriculture Organization. At the 2002 Commonwealth Games in Manchester, England, she set the championship record in the 100 metres and in the 4×100 m relay with the Bahamian team, recording a personal best of 10.91 seconds in the individual event.

At the 2008 Summer Olympics in Beijing she competed at the 100 metres sprint. In her first round heat she placed second behind Oludamola Osayomi in a time of 11.17 to advance to the second round. There she won her series to qualify for the semi finals in a time of 11.21, this time finishing in front of Osayomi. Despite fellow Bahamian Chandra Sturrup being unable to qualify for the final with a time of 11.22 in the first semi final, Ferguson managed to qualify with the same time as she finished fourth in her race, while Sturrup finished fifth in hers. In the final Ferguson came to 11.19 seconds, which was the 7th position.

She competed at the 2009 Manchester City Games, winning the 150 metres final in 16.54 seconds. She followed this up with a win in the 200 m at the Meeting Mohammed VI d' Athlétisme in Rabat. At the 25th Vardinoyiannia in Rethymno, Greece, she ran a world-leading time of 22.32 seconds to win the 200 m and set a meeting record. Now trains in Clermont, Florida at the NTC.

Major competition record

On 16 October 2002 Debbie Ferguson-McKenzie was nominated Goodwill Ambassador of the Food and Agriculture Organization of the United Nations (FAO).

References

External links

1976 births
Living people
Bahamian female sprinters
Olympic gold medalists for the Bahamas
Olympic silver medalists for the Bahamas
Olympic bronze medalists for the Bahamas
Athletes (track and field) at the 1996 Summer Olympics
Athletes (track and field) at the 2000 Summer Olympics
Athletes (track and field) at the 2004 Summer Olympics
Athletes (track and field) at the 2008 Summer Olympics
Athletes (track and field) at the 2012 Summer Olympics
Olympic athletes of the Bahamas
Athletes (track and field) at the 1994 Commonwealth Games
Athletes (track and field) at the 2002 Commonwealth Games
Commonwealth Games gold medallists for the Bahamas
Commonwealth Games medallists in athletics
Athletes (track and field) at the 1999 Pan American Games
Pan American Games gold medalists for the Bahamas
Pan American Games medalists in athletics (track and field)
Georgia Lady Bulldogs track and field athletes
University of Georgia alumni
World Athletics Championships medalists
Medalists at the 2004 Summer Olympics
Bahamian people of Jamaican descent
Medalists at the 2000 Summer Olympics
Medalists at the 1996 Summer Olympics
Olympic gold medalists in athletics (track and field)
Olympic silver medalists in athletics (track and field)
Olympic bronze medalists in athletics (track and field)
Goodwill Games medalists in athletics
Houston Cougars track and field coaches
IAAF Continental Cup winners
World Athletics Championships winners
Competitors at the 1998 Goodwill Games
Competitors at the 2001 Goodwill Games
Medalists at the 1999 Pan American Games
Goodwill Games gold medalists in athletics
Olympic female sprinters
Medallists at the 2002 Commonwealth Games